Patriarch George II may refer to:

 Patriarch George II of Alexandria, ruled in 1021–1051
 George II of Constantinople, Ecumenical Patriarch in 1191–1198
 George II Beseb'ely, Maronite Patriarch of Antioch in 1657–1670
 Patriarch Ignatius George II, head of the Syriac Orthodox Church in 1687–1708